In molecular biology, SMAD5 antisense RNA 1 (non-protein coding), also known as SMAD5-AS1 or DAMS is a long non-coding RNA. It is antisense to, and nested within, the SMAD5 gene. In humans it is found on chromosome 5. In humans, expression of this RNA is detected in foetal heart, foetal adrenal glands and in pancreatic tumours. It may play a role in regulation of SMAD5.

See also
 Long noncoding RNA

References

Non-coding RNA